Public good may refer to:
 Public good (economics), an economic good that is both non-excludable and non-rivalrous
 The common good, outcomes that are beneficial for all or most members of a community

See also
 Digital public goods